The Alfa Romeo C43 is a Formula One car designed and built by Alfa Romeo competing in the 2023 Formula One World Championship.

The car is driven by Valtteri Bottas and Zhou Guanyu, both in their second year at the team.

Design and development
On 26 August 2022, Alfa Romeo announced that they would leave Formula One at the end of 2023, ending their partnership with Sauber, making C43 the last Sauber-engineered car to be badged as an Alfa Romeo. On 20 January 2023, it was announced that the C43 would be launched on 7 February.

Launch and pre-season testing 
Alfa Romeo revealed their car design on 7 February 2023 via livestream. The car donned a new red-and-black livery, representing the departure of the previous year's title sponsor (Orlen Unipetrol) and the entry of global digital brokerage platform Stake.com taking said role.

Complete Formula One results
(key)

* Season still in progress.

References

External links 
 

C43